The Knik River  (Dena'ina: Skitnu; Ahtna: Scitna’) is a 25-mile-long (40 km) river in the U.S. state of Alaska. Its source is at Knik Glacier, from which it flows northwest and west and empties into the head of Cook Inlet's Knik Arm, near the mouth of the Matanuska River.  It is bridged twice (old and new bridges) where the Old Glenn Highway crosses it near the Butte, and also bridged on the Hayflats.

It is characterized by a broad flat plain with a bed of finely ground gravel and sand and silt. During windstorms, large quantities of fine material is blown from the riverbed and deposited in locations generally downstream or west. The river itself is relatively shallow and wide and considered a class I float. Discharge normally is about 5000 to 6000 ft3/s in the summer (140 to 170 m3/s), with floods of 60,000cfs or more not uncommon.

The term "knik," present in the names of the river, the arm of Cook Inlet, and the glacier, as well as the communities of Knik-Fairview and Knik River, derives from the Inupiaq word igniq ("fire").  The Denaina term for the Knik river was "Skitnu", (meaning Brush River).

The river runs near the border between the Matanuska-Susitna Borough and the Municipality of Anchorage. Much of its length is paralleled by the paved Old Glenn Highway and the paved (as of 2000) Knik River Road, along which can be found the community of Knik River.

See also
List of rivers of Alaska

References

Rivers of Anchorage, Alaska
Rivers of Matanuska-Susitna Borough, Alaska
Rivers of Alaska
Denaʼina